Gallows are an English hardcore punk band from Watford, Hertfordshire. The band was formed in 2005 after Laurent Barnard's previous band disbanded. Gallows' debut album, Orchestra of Wolves, was distributed in the United States by Epitaph Records, and they were subsequently signed to Warner Bros. Records for a £1 million album contract and recorded Grey Britain. The band has been particularly successful in the UK, with two songs charting on the UK Single Charts, and have been featured in magazines such as Kerrang!, Alternative Press and Rolling Stone.

History

Formation and Orchestra of Wolves (2005–2008)
Gallows formed in 2005 and released their debut album Orchestra of Wolves in 2006 on In at the Deep End Records. The album received acclaim and caught the attention of Bad Religion's Brett Gurewitz, who released it in the US on Epitaph Records, with new tracks including a cover of Black Flag's "Nervous Breakdown". In an interview Gurewitz named Orchestra of Wolves as one of his favourite albums of 2007, praising it as being the best hardcore album since Refused's The Shape of Punk to Come.

Gallows' 2007 tour included stops at the South by Southwest showcase festival, Warped Tour 2007, Download Festival, Taste of Chaos, and the Reading Festival, where the band paused its performance so singer Frank Carter could get tattooed onstage by New Found Glory guitarist Chad Gilbert.

The band won the 2007 Kerrang! Award for best British Newcomer.

Their song "In the Belly of a Shark" is featured in Guitar Hero III: Legends of Rock.

Gallows' third single, a cover of The Ruts' "Staring at the Rude Bois", was their first UK top 40 single, appearing at number 31 on the chart on 25 November 2007, the track features guest vocals by Lethal Bizzle. The song was featured in the 2008 Jim Carrey film Yes Man. The band in February released a single, "Just Because You Sleep Next to Me Doesn't Mean You're Safe", the video for which was filmed at Emo's in Texas.

In January 2008, the band's show at the House of Blues in Anaheim, California was cancelled after Disney, reportedly after listening to Orchestra of Wolves, chose to ban them from performing.

Gallows contributed a cover of "Wrathchild" to Maiden Heaven: A Tribute to Iron Maiden.

On 18 August 2008, the song Gold Dust was made available on the band's MySpace profile. They stated that the song would not appear on the second studio album, saying it was "...just a little treat for everyone that's been asking for new Gallows songs for a while."

Grey Britain (2008–2011)

On 5 December 2008, Thrash Hits revealed that the title of Gallows' second album would be Grey Britain. The album was released on 2 May 2009.

To support the album, Gallows performed the entire 2009 Vans Warped Tour. and supported AFI on an American tour. In order to tour with AFI, Gallows postponed shows in Australia and New Zealand.

In December 2009, Gallows mutually parted ways with Warner Brothers.

On 6 June 2010, Gallows played at Rage Against the Machine's victory parade at Finsbury Park in London, UK. They supported Rage Against the Machine and Gogol Bordello at the O2 in Dublin on 7 June 2010.

Gallows played at the Soundwave Festival during late February and early March 2010. They performed on the second stage at the Warrior's Dance Festival at the National Bowl on 24 July 2010, played at the 2010 UK Sonisphere Festival, as well as co-headlining Kent's Hevy Festival on 7 August 2010. They also played Reading and Leeds Festivals 2010 on the Lock Up stage under the pseudonym of The Rats.

On 17 December 2010, the band played at Dingwalls, in Camden, London, during the afternoon, and performed the entire Orchestra of Wolves album. In the evening, they then went on to Camden's Electric Ballroom venue, and played Grey Britain in its entirety, with four members of The Heritage Orchestra. Both shows were recorded for a live DVD.

Lineup change, Death Is Birth and self-titled third album (2011–2014)

Frank Carter left Gallows in July 2011, issuing a statement that the band "have hit a crossroads in our writing process and unfortunately myself and the rest of the boys have different ideas regarding the sound of Gallows going forward. Gallows have decided they are going to continue on without me and I wish the boys the best of luck for the future."

Frank's brother and bandmate Steph remarked: "As you all know, we've been in the studio for the past few months working on a follow up to Grey Britain. It pains me to say that as of 1 August Frank will no longer be a member of Gallows. Creatively, we could not agree on a direction for the new record and came to the conclusion that parting ways was for the best. Frank will be releasing music with his new project Pure Love later this year and we all wish him best. He is and will always be our brother, as well as an integral part of the start of our career." The band made their last festival appearance with Frank at the Sonisphere festival, and he played his final show with Gallows at London ULU on 23 July 2011.

Frank Carter eventually formed another project under the name Frank Carter and the Rattlesnakes, returning to his hardcore punk roots.

Former Alexisonfire guitarist/vocalist Wade MacNeil replaced Carter as Gallows' singer in August 2011, shortly after Alexisonfire announced their disbandment. The band's first recording with MacNeil, the 40-second "True Colours", was released as a free digital download. The 4-song Death Is Birth EP, recorded in Los Angeles with The Bronx guitarist Joby Ford as producer, was released that December through Thirty Days of Night Records.

Gallows began recording their third album, and first with MacNeil, in April 2012. They launched their own record label, Venn Records, through which to release it. The eponymously titled Gallows was released 10 September 2012, and was distributed by Bridge Nine Records in North America. In February 2013 the band announced that they would be continuing as a four-piece, with Steph Carter leaving to focus on his other band, Ghost Riders in the Sky. In July 2014 Gallows played a string of festival shows throughout Europe including Sonisphere Festival at Knebworth, and once again retreated to the studio in Watford to write and record their fourth album.

Desolation Sounds (2014–2015)
In the summer of 2014 the band completed their fourth album, titled Desolation Sounds, with the release originally planned for November. However, the release date was pushed back, with the album instead being released on 13 April 2015. The album's first single 'Bonfire Season' was debuted on the Radio 1 Rock Show with Daniel P Carter on 11 January, with a release date of 9 February being given for the EP, which will also feature a remix and two bonus cover tracks.

Hiatus, other projects and return (2015–present)

Gallows played their final show in support of Desolation Sounds on 31 May 2015 at the Rockavaria festival. Following the end of the tour, McNeil reunited with Alexisonfire for a run of live shows, while Barnard joined the band Krokodil and formed a new band, Gold Key. Barratt also founded a new band, Funeral Shakes.

On 16 October 2018 the band's Twitter account posted an 11-second video featuring their logo and dissonant noise. A week later, the band were announced as one of the first eight bands to be part of the 2019 Slam Dunk Festival line-up.

Musical style and influences
Gallows' music is generally categorised as hardcore punk. The sound of Grey Britain often bordered metalcore, while Desolation Sounds included elements of post-punk and gothic rock.

In a 2009 article, The Washington Post described them as "a snarling punk quintet from England who mix Motörhead-like riffs with a rage that's born of working-class British bile". They have cited influences including Black Flag, Minor Threat, Swing Kids, JR Ewing, Drive Like Jehu, the Murder City Devils, the Stooges, the Clash, Discharge, Hot Snakes and Black Sabbath.

Members

Current members
 Laurent "Lags" Barnard – guitar, vocals 
 Stuart Gili-Ross – bass guitar, vocals 
 Lee Barratt – drums, percussion 
 Wade MacNeil – lead vocals 

Former members
 Paul Laventure – guitar, vocals 
 Frank Carter – lead vocals 
 Steph Carter – guitar, vocals 

Timeline

Discography

Studio albums

EPs

Singles

Other appearances 
The following Gallows songs were released on compilation albums. This is not an exhaustive list; songs that were first released on the band's albums, EPs, or singles are not included.

Music videos

References

External links

 
 

British hardcore punk groups
English punk rock groups
Musical groups established in 2005
Musical quintets
Kerrang! Awards winners
Bridge 9 Records artists